Swati Verma is an Indian actress working primarily with Bhojpuri film industry. She has acted in Tamil, Malayalam and Bhojpuri films. She established a career in Bhojpuri language films and is cited as one of its most popular celebrities. Verma reached stardom soon after her first Bhojpuri film Sasurari Zindabad. She performed a small role in other movies including Pyaasi Patni and Mastani.

Early life
Swati hails from Bilaspur, Chhattisgarh but her birthplace is Mumbai. Her parents are doctors, and worked in KEM hospital, Mumbai, in the 1970s. Later, they shifted to Bilaspur and Verma went to Russia. She earned her diploma in Russian and studied interior design there. She is a Kathak dancer. She is a devout Hindu.

Career
Reflecting on her early days, she stated, "Hailing from a place like Bilaspur that is nowhere even distantly associated to glitz and glamour, acting did seem a bit far-fetched". Before starting her career as an actress, Swati trained at the Kishore Namit Kapoor Acting Institute in Mumbai. She made her acting debut in serial Ek din ki vardi (Sahara). Later, she appeared in Suraag (SAB TV) and Aryaman (Doordarshan network).

Selected filmography

See also
 Bhojpuri Cinema
 Rinku Ghosh
 Subhi Sharma

References

21st-century Indian actresses
Living people
Actresses in Bhojpuri cinema
Indian television actresses
Actresses from Chhattisgarh
People from Bilaspur, Chhattisgarh
Year of birth missing (living people)
Actresses in Malayalam cinema
Actresses in Tamil cinema